The white-tailed antsangy (Brachytarsomys albicauda) is a species of rodent in the family Nesomyidae. It is found only in Madagascar.

References

Brachytarsomys
Mammals of Madagascar
Mammals described in 1875
Taxa named by Albert Günther
Taxonomy articles created by Polbot